Present Tense is the first Sagittarius album, released in 1968 by Columbia Records. Though the record was basically a Gary Usher solo project, he enlisted many top LA session musicians, and heavily utilized Curt Boettcher as a songwriter, musician, vocalist, and producer (even going so far as to include two tracks that Boettcher had produced on his own as the leader of the group The Ballroom). The album also contains the recording "My World Fell Down", which had no Boettcher involvement, albeit the LP version was edited, with the musique concrète bridge from the single version being excised (though a few extra bars of music were added in between the first and second verses). The single "Hotel Indiscreet" also had a similar fate when it reached the LP.

The album was reissued on CD by Sundazed Records in 1997 with 9 bonus tracks. Two of these are the original single versions of "My World Fell Down" and "Hotel Indiscreet", as well as another track from The Ballroom, a Sandy Salisbury song, and the instrumental track for a song that was recorded by Chad & Jeremy. In 2006 the album was reissued again on CD in Japan by Sony in a Mini-LP style sleeve, featuring the album but with different bonus tracks, then again in 2009 by Rev-Ola Records but with the same track listing as the Sundazed reissue. The track listing given below reflects the original LP.

Track listing
 "Another Time" (Boettcher)
 "Song to the Magic Frog (Will You Ever Know)" (Boettcher, O'Malley)
 "You Know I've Found a Way" (Boettcher/Mallory)
 "The Keeper of the Games" (Boettcher)
 "Glass" (Marks, Sheldon)
 "Would You like to Go" (Alexander, Boettcher)
 "My World Fell Down" (Carter, Stephens)
 "Hotel Indiscreet" (Gordon, Griffin)
 "I'm Not Living Here" (Boettcher)
 "Musty Dusty" (Boettcher)
 "The Truth Is Not Real" (Usher)

Bonus tracks (Sundazed & Rev-Ola reissues)
 Artificial Light (Of All the Living Lies) (Badale/Levitt)
 Get the Message (Gordon/Griffin)
 Mass # 586 (Usher)
 Love's Fatal Way (Boettcher/Naylor)
 My World Fell Down (Single Version)
 Hotel Indiscreet (Gordon/Griffin)
 Lonely Girl (Salisbury)
 The Keeper of the Games (Demo)
 Sister Marie (Instrumental)

Japan reissue bonus tracks
 My World Fell Down (Mono Single Version)
 Hotel Indiscreet (Mono Single Version)
 Another Time (Mono Single Version)
 You Know I've Found a Way (Mono Single Version)
 The Truth Is Not Real (Mono Single Version)
 I'm Not Living Here (Mono Single Version)
 The Keeper of the Games (Mono Single Version)
 Virgo
 Libra
 Pisces

References

Sagittarius (band) albums
1968 debut albums
Albums produced by Gary Usher
Albums produced by Curt Boettcher
Columbia Records albums
Sundazed Records albums